Tuomas Harjula (born 08 June 1998) is a Finnish biathlete. He has competed in the Biathlon World Cup since 2020.

Biathlon results
All results are sourced from the International Biathlon Union.

Olympic Games
0 medals

World Championships
0 medals

*During Olympic seasons competitions are only held for those events not included in the Olympic program.
**The single mixed relay was added as an event in 2019.

References

External links

1998 births
Living people
People from Tuusula
Finnish male biathletes
Biathletes at the 2016 Winter Youth Olympics
Biathletes at the 2022 Winter Olympics
Olympic biathletes of Finland
Sportspeople from Uusimaa